Iotated A is a letter of the Cyrillic script, built as a ligature of the letters І and А, and used today only in Church Slavonic. It is unusual among early Cyrillic letters in having no direct counterpart in Glagolitic: Ⱑ (jat’) is used for both /ě/ and /ja/. Accordingly, many early Cyrillic texts (particularly those with Glagolitic antecedents) may use  for both these purposes; this practice continues into the fourteenth century, but is much more common in the South Slavonic than the East Slavonic area.  Nevertheless,  is attested in the earliest extant Cyrillic writings, including for example the Codex Suprasliensis and Savvina Kniga - this was not supported to other fonts in other applications.

It continued in use in Serbian until the orthographical reforms of Vuk Karadžić, and in Bulgarian (where it also acquired a civil script glyph variant) until the late nineteenth century. This is still the case in modern Church Slavonic, where, broadly speaking,  is used initially and Ѧ elsewhere, though exceptionally they may be used to make other distinctions, such as that between  'tongue' and  'people'.

In cursive, the letter was modified: the left side was gradually lost, turning only into a flourish, so it began to look like an 'а' with a 'с'-shaped tail at the top left (a similar metamorphosis occurred with the cursive 'Ю').

Computing codes

References

External links 

 CYRILLIC CAPITAL LETTER IOTIFIED A (U+A656) on ScriptSource.org
 CYRILLIC SMALL LETTER IOTIFIED A (U+A657) on ScriptSource.org

Cyrillic ligatures